Hillas Farm Homestead is a heritage-listed homestead complex at Bannaby, Upper Lachlan Shire, New South Wales, Australia. It is also known as Hillasmount. It was added to the New South Wales State Heritage Register on 2 April 1999.

History 

Hillas Farm Homestead was built  1876 by Martha and Matthew Hillas. The property had existed since 1826.

It remained in the Hillas family until 1953, when Evelyn Hillas bequeathed it to a family friend upon her death at age 93.

A Permanent Conservation Order was issued for the property in June 1984.

Description

The homestead is a four-bedroom home built from lathe and plaster, with various outbuildings.

Heritage listing 
Hillas Farm Homestead was listed on the New South Wales State Heritage Register on 2 April 1999.

See also

References

Attribution 

New South Wales State Heritage Register
Homesteads in New South Wales
Articles incorporating text from the New South Wales State Heritage Register
Upper Lachlan Shire